Woodmont is an unincorporated community in Washington County, Maryland, United States. Western Maryland Railroad Right-of-Way, Milepost 126 to Milepost 160 was listed on the National Register of Historic Places in 1980.

References

Unincorporated communities in Washington County, Maryland
Unincorporated communities in Maryland